Ironsworn is a role-playing game written and self-published by Shawn Tomkin. The game received the 2019 ENNIE Gold Winner Award for Best Free Game/Product. It is available for free, and has been praised for its high quality and simplicity for beginners to role-playing games.

Settings
While Ironsworn can accommodate a variety of settings, the core rulebook includes a default setting called the Ironlands. The Ironlands setting is low fantasy, set in a rugged frontier.

System

Character creation
Player characters are built by allocating a specific number of points to the five different stats. These are edge, heart, iron, shadow, and wits. 

Apart from the starting stats, there are also trackers for health, spirit, and supply. 

Vows are the main mechanic by which a player can track progress and accomplish goals.

Gameplay
There are three ways to play Ironsworn.

 Guided: One or more players take the role of their characters, while a gamemaster (GM) moderates the session.
 Co-Op: One or more players play together to overcome challenges and complete quests. No GM required.
 Solo: One player portrays a lone character driven to fulfill vows in a dangerous world. 

Tomkin took inspiration from the Powered by the Apocalypse system, among other systems. The player narrates the story and then makes Moves when it makes narrative sense. If for instance, the player is about to enter combat, they can make the Enter the Fray move. Dice are rolled to determine if the move is a success or a failure.

The player accumulates Momentum through succeeding at rolls or through narrative. Momentum can be used to improve the result of a die roll.

Experience can be gained by completing vows and then spent upgrading existing assets or gaining new ones.

Supplements
There are three official supplements that have been published by Shawn Tomkin.
 Ironsworn Lodestar (2018): A short reference guide that contains an oracle for character disposition and also alternative starting stats for easier and harder modes of play.
 Ironsworn: Delve (2020): The first major expansion adds additional content to the game, including dungeon-crawling mechanics.
 Ironsworn: Starforged (2022): Funded in a Kickstarter campaign, this is a new core rulebook adapting the original Ironsworn system to a science fiction setting. Along with the new setting, there are also new rules, assets, moves, and oracles.
A supplement for the Starforged system, Sundered Isles, is currently in development. This supplement will focus on a sailing setting, and will require the core Ironsworn: Starforged rules to play.

See also
 Dungeon World
 Powered by the Apocalypse

Notes

External links
 Official website
 Ironsworn on DriveThruRPG
 Ironsworn on itch.io
 Actual Play reports on Ironsworn and Starforged

ENnies winners
Role-playing game systems
Role-playing games introduced in 2018
Universal role-playing games